GGN may refer to:

 Air Georgian (ICAO: GGN), a Canadian airline
 Gagnoa Airport (IATA: GGN), in Ivory Coast
 GLOBALG.A.P, GLOBALG.A.P. Number
 Global Geoparks Network
 Glycin, a photographic developing agent
 Gurgaon railway station, in Haryana, India
 Gurung language (ISO 639:ggn), spoken by the Gurung people of Nepal
 Reformed Congregations in the Netherlands